A double is a look-alike or doppelgänger; one person or being that resembles another.

Double, The Double or Dubble may also refer to:

Film and television
 Double (filmmaking), someone who substitutes for the credited actor of a character
 The Double (1934 film), a German crime comedy film
 The Double (1971 film), an Italian film
 The Double (2011 film), a spy thriller film
 The Double (2013 film), a film based on the Dostoevsky novella
 Kamen Rider Double, a 2009–10 Japanese television series
 Kamen Rider Double (character), the protagonist in a Japanese television series of the same name

Food and drink
 Doppio, a double shot of espresso
 Dubbel, a strong Belgian Trappist beer or, more generally, a strong brown ale
 A drink order of two shots of hard liquor in one glass
 A "double decker", a hamburger with two patties in a single bun

Games
 Double, action in games whereby a competitor raises the stakes 
 , in contract bridge
 Doubling cube, in backgammon
 Double, villain in the video game Mega Man X4
 A kart racing game Mario Kart: Double Dash
 An arcade action game Double Dragon

Literature
 The Double (Dostoevsky novel), an 1846 novella by Fyodor Dostoevsky
 The Double (Saramago novel), a 2002 novel by José Saramago
 Double (manga), a 2019 manga series by Ayako Noda
 Andrew Dubble, the primary character in the Andrew Lost children's novels

Mathematics and computing
 Multiplication by 2
 Double precision, a floating-point representation of numbers that is typically 64 bits in length
 A split-complex number of the form , where 
 A 2-tuple, or ordered list of two elements, commonly called an ordered pair, denoted 
 Double (manifold), in topology

Music
 Double album, audio album spanning two units of the primary medium in which it is sold, typically records and CDs
 Doubling (voicing), a kind of musical voicing
 Double variation, a variation form in music
 Pasodoble, a traditional couple's dance from Spain
 Double (singer) (born 1975), Japanese R&B singer
 Double (band), Swiss pop duo that had their biggest hit in 1986 with "Captain of Her Heart"
 Double (Roch Voisine album), a 1990 album by Roch Voisine 
 Double (Zhao Wei album), a 2005 album by Zhao Wei
 "Double" (BoA song), 2003
 "The Double", an instrumental by Clint Mansell from the Black Swan soundtrack (2010)
 The Double Violin Concerto (Bach) in D minor, BWV 1043, commonly referred to as "The Double" among violinists

People
 Baron Emile Double (1869–1938), vigneron who established the vineyard at Château de Beaupré
 François-Joseph Double (1776–1842), French physician
 Marie-Louise Double de Saint-Lambert (1891–1974), French philanthropist later known as Countess Lily Pastré
 Steve Double (born 1966), British Conservative Party politician, Member of Parliament (MP) for St Austell and Newquay since 2015

Places
 Double (lunar crater), in Mare Tranquillitatis
 Double Lake, a lake in Minnesota, US

Sports
 Double (association football), the act of a winning a division and primary cup competition in the same season
 Double (baseball), a two-base hit in baseball
 The Double (Seattle Mariners), a specific instance of the above that occurred during the 1995 Major League Baseball season
 Double (cricket), the feat of scoring a thousand first-class runs and taking a hundred first-class wickets in a single season
 Double (volleyball), scoring ten or more in a statistical category (aces, kills, blocks, digs, or assists) in a single match
 Double-double (basketball), accumulating ten or more in two of five statistical categories (points, rebounds, assists, steals, or blocks) in a single game
 Double Duty, a driver attempting to compete in the Indycar Indianapolis 500 and NASCAR Coca-Cola 600 on the same day
 The Double (Gaelic games), the act of winning the All-Ireland Senior Football Championship and the All-Ireland Senior Hurling Championship in the same year
 The Double (rugby league), winning the Super League and Challenge Cup in one season

Other
 Double, a bet which combines two selections; see Glossary of bets offered by UK bookmakers#Double
 Polish Enigma doubles, replicating the function of Nazi Germany's cipher machines
 Double, a former fraction of the Guernsey pound
 Double, a former rank of liturgical feast in the Roman Rite of the Catholic Church
 Double-flowered form of plants

See also

 Double letter
 Doubles (disambiguation)
 Doubling (disambiguation)
 Duplication (disambiguation)
 Single (disambiguation)
 Binary (disambiguation)
 Dual (disambiguation)
 Duo (disambiguation)
 Pair (disambiguation)
 Twin (disambiguation)